Indooroopilly may refer to:
 Indooroopilly, Queensland, a suburb of Brisbane, Australia
 Indooroopilly bus station
 Indooroopilly Division, a former local government area
 Indooroopilly Island Conservation Park
 Indooroopilly Railway Bridge
 Indooroopilly railway station
 Indooroopilly Reach, a reach of the Brisbane River
 Indooroopilly Shopping Centre (formerly Westfield Indooroopilly aka Indooroopilly Shoppingtown)
 Indooroopilly State High School
 Electoral district of Indooroopilly, an electoral district of the Queensland Legislative Assembly
 Shire of Indooroopilly, a former local government area